Jon Xabier 'Jonxa' Vidal Alonso (born 20 July 1991) is a Spanish footballer who plays for Arenas Club de Getxo as a midfielder.

Club career
Born in Leioa, Biscay, Vidal joined Athletic Bilbao's youth setup in 2002, aged 11. On 28 November 2012 he made his debut with the first team, coming on as a substitute for fellow youth graduate Álvaro Peña in the 85th minute of a 0–2 away win against Hapoel Ironi Kiryat Shmona F.C. in that season's UEFA Europa League.

Vidal spent three seasons with the reserves in the Segunda División B before being released in May 2014. On 7 July he moved to neighbours Barakaldo CF, also in the third level. He scored four goals in his only season with Barakaldo, before joining FC Cartagena in July 2015.

References

External links

1991 births
Living people
People from Greater Bilbao
Spanish footballers
Footballers from the Basque Country (autonomous community)
Association football midfielders
Segunda División B players
Tercera División players
CD Basconia footballers
Athletic Bilbao footballers
Bilbao Athletic footballers
Barakaldo CF footballers
FC Cartagena footballers
CD Guijuelo footballers
Arenas Club de Getxo footballers
Sportspeople from Biscay